The 2017 FC Astana season is the ninth successive season that the club will play in the Kazakhstan Premier League, the highest tier of association football in Kazakhstan. Astana are defending Kazakhstan Premier League Champions, having been crowned Champions for the third time the previous season, and the defending Kazakhstan Cup champions. Astana will also enter the Champions League, entering at the Second Qualifying Stage.

Squad

Transfers

Winter

In:

Out:

Summer

In:

Out:

Friendlies

Competitions

Kazakhstan Super Cup

Premier League

Results summary

Results by round

Results

League table

Kazakhstan Cup

UEFA Champions League

Qualifying rounds

UEFA Europa League

Group stage

Squad statistics

Appearances and goals

|-
|colspan="14"|Players away from Astana on loan:

|-
|colspan="14"|Players who left Astana during the season:
|}

Goal scorers

Clean sheets

Disciplinary record

Notes

References

External links
Official Website 
Official VK

FC Astana seasons
Astana
Astana